The men's doubles tournament of the 2017 BWF World Championships (World Badminton Championships) took place from 21 to 27 August.

Seeds

  Li Junhui / Liu Yuchen (second round)
  Mathias Boe / Carsten Mogensen (quarterfinals)
  Marcus Fernaldi Gideon / Kevin Sanjaya Sukamuljo (quarterfinals)
  Takeshi Kamura / Keigo Sonoda (semifinals)
  Goh V Shem / Tan Wee Kiong (second round)
  Chai Biao / Hong Wei (semifinals)
  Mads Conrad-Petersen / Mads Pieler Kolding (quarterfinals)
  Liu Cheng / Zhang Nan (champion)

  Angga Pratama / Ricky Karanda Suwardi (third round)
  Vladimir Ivanov / Ivan Sozonov (third round)
  Lu Ching-yao / Yang Po-han (third round)
  Kim Astrup / Anders Skaarup Rasmussen (second round)
  Huang Kaixiang / Wang Yilyu (third round)
  Marcus Ellis / Chris Langridge (third round)
  Takuto Inoue / Yuki Kaneko (third round)
  Mathias Christiansen / David Daugaard (third round)

Draw

Finals

Section 1

Section 2

Section 3

Section 4

References
Draw

2017 BWF World Championships